Geophis ruthveni, also known as Ruthven's earth snake, is a snake of the colubrid family. It is found in Costa Rica.

References

Geophis
Snakes of North America
Reptiles of Costa Rica
Endemic fauna of Costa Rica
Taxa named by Franz Werner
Reptiles described in 1925